"The One" is a song recorded by Colombian singer-songwriter Shakira for her first English-language and fifth overall studio album Laundry Service (2001). The ballad was released as the album's sixth and final single on 16 December 2002 by Epic Records and became a modest hit in Europe and Australia.

Background and composition
"The One" was written by Shakira and composed by Shakira and Glen Ballard. This song is about Shakira's lonely love, and her expression and thanks for the love that has been given to her. Though the song itself was an extremely popular song, and many people were "touched" by it, it did not fare well chart-wise. Shakira has never performed this live at any shows except for her 2002–2003 Tour of the Mongoose, when the single was released around the time. The primary version used for radio airplay was the Glen's Radio Mix, which has a new intro and a complete different musical arrangement than the original Album Version.

Chart performance
"The One" was released in most parts of Europe as well as other countries such as Australia. The song did moderately well in European countries, including Italy and Switzerland, where it reached the top 20. It was a top-five hit in Portugal, where it peaked at number five. In Australia, the song peaked at number 16.

Music video
The music video for "The One" has a basic plot. Shakira is walking through a city, wearing a red jacket, where she sees all the people with their lovers loving and hugging each other, while she is alone. She therefore walks through the rain, hoping to find someone who will love her forever. While she walks through the rain, she sees an old couple, a mother with her child, a police attacking a man with an old woman watching, needing someone to help him and he mimes "you're the one I need", while on the contrary she is alone. The music video ends with her, drenched by the rain, singing while facing up to the sky.

Formats and track listings
Maxi-single
 "The One" (Glen's Radio Mix) – 3:47
 "The One" (Album Version) – 3:43
 "Whenever, Wherever" (Hammad Bell Remix) – 3:48
 "Te Aviso, Te Anuncio (Tango)" (Gigi D'Agostino Tango Remix) – 6:10

Enhanced single
 "The One" (Glen's Mix)
 "Objection (Tango)" (Afro Punk Version)
 "Objection (Tango)" (The Freelance Hellraiser's Mash-Up of the Mongoose)
 "The One" (video)

Charts

Release history

References

2000s ballads
2003 singles
Shakira songs
Songs written by Glen Ballard
Songs written by Shakira